Maggie C. A. Hogarth (née de Alarcon) is an American writer and artist who works in the science fiction, fantasy, and anthropomorphic animal genres. The Internet Speculative Fiction Database catalogs her illustrations as by Maggie de Alarcon (1990 to 1997) and Micah Hogarth (1997 and 1998).

In May 2015, Hogarth was elected Vice President of SFWA.

Biography
Hogarth was born in the United States, the daughter of two Cuban political exiles. As of December 2013, she lives in Florida, US.

"Space Marine" controversy
In mid-December 2012, Games Workshop made a complaint to Amazon.com about Hogarth's novel Spots the Space Marine (a near-future military science fiction novel about real marines). Games Workshop indicated that the work infringed on their trademark of the words "space marine", and, as a result, Amazon blocked sales of the book.

This led to an internet backlash from commentators such as Cory Doctorow and digital rights group the Electronic Frontier Foundation, who questioned the right of Games Workshop to trademark the term. Subsequently, Spots the Space Marine reappeared on Amazon, and Games Workshop issued no further legal action.

Political views

Despite queer themes in some of her fiction, in real life she describes herself as a Christian conservative, and she is vocally opposed to abortion on demand and privileged treatment of claimed gender dysphoria.

Honors and awards
Hogarth was a guest of honor at the Midwest FurFest furry convention in 2003 and 2009. Her short story "In the Line of Duty" was the winner of the 2003 Ursa Major Award for Best Anthropomorphic Short Fiction.

In 2004, her story The Flight of the Godkin Griffin was nominated in the Best Other Work category of the Gaylactic Spectrum Awards.

Bibliography

 Alysha's Fall (Sep 1, 2000)
 The Elements of Freedom (Pelted Shorts 3) (Nov 4, 2010) 
 In The Line of Duty (Alysha Forrest 3) (Sep 20, 2010)
 Dark Lighthouse (Alysha Forrest 4) (Sep 28, 2010) 
 Second (Alysha Forrest 2) (Oct 4, 2010)
 His Neuter Face (Jokka Shorts) (Oct 10, 2010) 
 Fire in the Void (Oct 12, 2010)
 A Trifold Spiral Knot (Jokka Shorts) (Oct 18, 2010)
 Freedom, Spiced and Drunk (Oct 19, 2010)
 Money for Sorrow, Made Joy (Jokka Shorts) (Oct 19, 2010)
 Stormfront (Oct 19, 2010)
 The Worth of a Shell (Oct 19, 2010)
 Unspeakable (Oct 19, 2010)
 Butterfly (Pelted Shorts) (Oct 25, 2010)
 Rosettes and Ribbons (Pelted Shorts 2) (Nov 8, 2010)
 New Stories (Jokka Shorts) (Nov 23, 2010)
 Season's Meaning (Alysha Forrest 5) (Nov 30, 2010) 
 Skip-Leveling (Dec 13, 2010)
 The Blade to Your Hand (Dec 19, 2010)
 Broken Chains (Oct 26, 2010)
 Breaths Long as Years (Compass Rose 1) (Feb 9, 2011)
 Useless Tears (Compass Rose 4) (Feb 9, 2011) 
 Not Now, Not Ever (Compass Rose 3) (Feb 13, 2011)
 A Divine Consistency (Feb 21, 2011)
 Bitter Apples (Mar 3, 2011)
 The Copper Bodice (Mar 29, 2011)
 The Perfect Totem (Mar 29, 2011)
 Snow in Summer, Flowers in Fall (Apr 3, 2011)
 Blueberries: A Poetry Chapbook (Apr 14, 2011) 
 Fire Queen, Dark Lady (Apr 18, 2011)
 Songs From a Conch Shell Whistle (Apr 26, 2011)
 Salome (May 7, 2011)
 Living the Moment (May 17, 2011)
 Stone Moon, Silk Scarves (May 19, 2011)
 Anadi Dolls (Jun 28, 2011) 
 Clays Beneath the Skies (Jul 1, 2011)
 Unknowable (Jul 20, 2011)
 The Smell of Intelligence (Jokka Shorts) (Aug 19, 2011) 
 Pantheon (Pelted Shorts 4) (Aug 25, 2011) 
 Family (Jahir and Vasiht'h) (Oct 26, 2011)
 The Snow Maiden, or the Case with the Holiday Blues (Jahir and Vasiht'h) (Nov 13, 2011)
 Even the Wingless (Sep 11, 2011)
 Precious Things (Sep 18, 2011) 
 A Rosary of Stones and Thorns (Sep 25, 2011)
 Spots the Space Marine: Defense of the Fiddler (Dec 14, 2011)
 Claws and Starships: A Collection of Pelted Short Fiction (Dec 18, 2011)
 Blades and Bitter Apples (Jan 13, 2012) 
 Spots the Space Marine: Letters (Spots 2) (Mar 15, 2012)
 The Case of the Poisoned House and Other Xenopsychiatric Studies (Jahir and Vasiht'h) (Apr 2, 2012) 
 The Aphorisms of Kherishdar (Apr 8, 2012)
 The Admonishments of Kherishdar (Apr 9, 2012)
 Flight of the Godkin Griffin: Book 1 of the Tale of the Godkindred (Jun 18, 2012)
 Black Blossom: A Fantasy of Manners Among Aliens, Volume 3 (Oct 4, 2012)
 From Spark to Finish: Running Your Kickstarter Campaign (Oct 8, 2012)
 Pearl in the Void: Book 2 of the Stone Moon Trilogy (Volume 2) (Mar 31, 2013)
 A Bloom in the North: Book 3 of the Stone Moon Trilogy (Apr 3, 2013)
 Earthrise (Her Instruments) (Volume 1) (Apr 30, 2013)
 Mindtouch (The Dreamhealers) (Volume 1) (Jun 15, 2013)
 Rose Point: Her Instruments, Book 2 (Volume 2) (Oct 7, 2013)
 The Godson's Triumph (The Godkindred Saga) (Oct 28, 2013)

References

External links
 
 
 

American fantasy writers
American women illustrators
American illustrators
Furry fandom people
Living people
American women novelists
Women science fiction and fantasy writers
Year of birth missing (living people)
Place of birth missing (living people)
American women short story writers
21st-century American novelists
21st-century American women writers
21st-century American short story writers
American writers of Cuban descent
Hispanic and Latino American women in the arts
Hispanic and Latino American novelists